Pinsk is a city in Belarus. It may also refer to:

 Johannes Pinsk (1891–1957), German Roman-Catholic theologian and priest
 Pinsk Voblast, a former administrative subdivision of Belarus
 Pinsk Raion, an administrative subdivision of Belarus
 Roman Catholic Diocese of Pinsk, a diocese at Pinsk
 Pinsk Marshes
 Pinsk Flotilla, see Riverine Flotilla of the Polish Navy
 Pinsk massacre in Pinsk in April 1919
 Ognisko Pińsk, a former Polish football team located at Pinsk
 FC Volna Pinsk, a football team located at Pinsk
 Pinsk (Hasidic dynasty), a family of rabbis from Pinsk and Karlin
see also Pinsky, a surname meaning "from Pinsk"